Hingod is a town in the north-central Mudug region of Somalia.

References
Xingood

Populated places in Mudug
Galmudug